Moondyne Nature Reserve is a reserve located within the Avon Valley National Park, in the Avon Valley, Western Australia.

Considered and reviewed in 1979 and 1980, it was established in 1981.

A guide was published in 1984 as to the features within the reserve.

A trip into the reserve area in 2013, was considered to one of the events that contributed to the establishment of the Toodyaypedia project.

Refs 

Avon River (Western Australia)
Nature reserves in Western Australia